A positron is an elementary particle of antimatter. 

Positron may also refer to: 
 Positron (video game), the 1983 video game published by Micro Power
 Positron! Records, a Chicago-based independent record label
 Positron Corporation, an American nuclear medicine healthcare company
 "Positron", a 1993 trance track by Cygnus X
 Positron, a bicycle shifting system from Shimano

See also
 Positron emission, the radioactive decay
 Positronic brain, the fictional device conceived by Isaac Asimov